Satori started in 2005 as a side project for Steve Borth, former saxophonist for Rx Bandits.  The band released Savor Every Moment in 2005 on Asian Man Records.  Other musicians on the album included other Rx Bandits members Matt Embree (guitar, backup vocals), Chris Tsagakis (drums), Chris Sheets (trombone), and Steve Choi (keyboards) with Borth taking saxophone and lead vocal duties. In June 2006, Borth left Rx Bandits to focus his attention to Satori.

With help from friends in the current reggae, ska and dub scene, including members of The Soul Captives, The Chris Murray Combo, Howards Alias and Westbound Train, Satori has produced two albums.

References

American rock music groups
Asian Man Records artists
Musical groups established in 2005
2005 establishments in the United States